The 2005 World Table Tennis Championships women's doubles was the 47th edition of the women's doubles championship.
Zhang Yining and Wang Nan defeated Niu Jianfeng and Guo Yue in the final by four sets to one.

Seeds

  Wang Nan /  Zhang Yining (champions)
  Guo Yue /  Niu Jianfeng (final)
  Bai Yang /  Guo Yan (semifinals)
  Tie Ya Na /  Zhang Rui (semifinals)
  Lau Sui Fei /  Song Ah Sim (quarterfinals)
  Csilla Bátorfi /  Krisztina Tóth (quarterfinals)
  Li Jiawei /  Xu Yan (third round)
  Kim Kyung-ah /  Kim Soong-sil (third round)
  Tamara Boroš /  Cornelia Vaida (quarterfinals)
  Kim Hyang-mi /  Kim Mi-yong (third round)
  Svetlana Ganina /  Irina Palina (second round)
  Saki Kanazawa /  Aya Umemura (third round)
  Tatyana Kostromina /  Viktoria Pavlovich (second round)
  Huang Yi-hua /  Lu Yun-feng (third round)
  Ai Fujinuma /  Ai Fukuhara (quarterfinals)
  Nikoleta Stefanova /  Wenling Tan Monfardini (third round)

Finals

References

External links
 Main draw archived from ITTF.
 Players' matches. ITTF.
 WM 2005 Shanghai (China). tt-wiki.info (in German).

-
World